Bod is a commune in Brașov County, Transylvania, Romania. It is composed of two villages, Bod and Colonia Bod (Botfalusi Cukorgyártelep). 

The commune is located in the eastern part of the county, in the northeastern corner of the Burzenland. It is situated on the left bank of the Olt River, which mostly follows the border with Covasna County.  The Ghimbășel River flows through Bod; originally it discharged directly into the Olt, but much of its flow has been diverted into the Bârsa River (another tributary of the Olt), near Colonia Bod.

At Colonia Bod there is one of Romania's largest sugar factories, which is now defunct, and a broadcasting transmitter for long- and medium-wave radio, the Bod Transmitter. The lowest ever recorded temperature in Romania, was measured in Bod on January 25, 1942.

At the 2011 census, 89.6% of inhabitants were Romanians, 8.5% Hungarians and 1.1% Germans.

Natives
 (1537–1585), humanist
Nicolae Oaidă (b. 1933), footballer and manager
Reinhardt Schuster (b. 1936), painter

References

External links

Communes in Brașov County
Localities in Transylvania
Burzenland